Ewo Airport  is an airport serving the village of Ewo in the Cuvette-Ouest Department, Republic of the Congo.

See also

 List of airports in the Republic of the Congo
 Transport in the Republic of the Congo

References

External links
OurAirports - Ewo
OpenStreetMap - Ewo

Airports in the Republic of the Congo